No creo en los hombres (English: I don't believe in men) is a Mexican telenovela produced by Televisa and originally transmitted by Telesistema Mexicano.

Cast 
Maricruz Olivier as Maria Victoria
Aarón Hernán
Carlos Fernández
Alicia Rodríguez as Alicia
Anita Blanch as Leonor
Fanny Schiller as Asuncion
Miguel Manzano
Alicia Montoya

References

External links 

 correct link

Mexican telenovelas
Televisa telenovelas
Spanish-language telenovelas
1969 telenovelas
1969 Mexican television series debuts
1969 Mexican television series endings